Molly Moore (born May 4, 1995) is an American adaptive rower who competed in international level events. She is a gold medalist at the 2019 World Rowing Championships in the PR3 W2-.

Moore was born with club feet and has had reconstructive surgery.

References

1995 births
Living people
Sportspeople from Indianapolis
Paralympic rowers of the United States
World Rowing Championships medalists for the United States
Harvard Crimson women's rowers
21st-century American women